Itapagipe is a municipality in the west of the Brazilian state of Minas Gerais.   the population was 15,379 in a total area of 1,795 km².  It became a municipality in 1885.

Location

Itapagipe is located at an elevation of 516 meters in the south-center of the area known as the Triângulo Mineiro 37 km. west of the Transbrasiliana highway—Br-153.  The Rio Grande, a tributary of the Paraná River, forms its southern boundary.  It belongs to the statistical micro-region of Frutal.  Neighboring municipalities are:
North: Frutal
Northwest: Campina Verde
West: São Francisco de Sales
South: Paulo de Faria, São Paulo

Distances
Belo Horizonte: - 648 km.
Frutal: - 48 km.
Uberaba: - 193 km.
Uberlândia: - 234 km 
São José do Rio Preto (SP): - 143 km
Iturama: – 98 km
São Paulo: – 600 km
Brasília: – 710 km

Origin of the name

The name Itapagipe comes from the tupi-guarani and means “hard rock”. This name was chosen because of a large rock that covers all of the bed of the Lageado stream, which crosses the town.

History

The district of Lageado, today Itapagipe, became a municipality in 1948, but it had been settled much earlier in 1880.  The first settler, Antônio Gomes Sobreiro, “married” a Caiapó Indian girl and established his ranch in the region.  A chapel was built and a small village began with the name of Santo Antônio do Lageado.

Economic activities

The most important economic activities are cattle raising, commerce, and agriculture.  The GDP in 2005 was R$ R$147,447.  Itapagipe is in the top tier of municipalities in the state with regard to economic and social development.   there were 02 banking agency in the town.  There was a well-developed retail infrastructure serving the surrounding area of cattle and agricultural lands.  In the rural area there were 1,336 establishments occupying about 3,300 persons.  414 of the farms had tractors, a ratio of one in three.   There were 1,912 automobiles in all of the municipality, about one for every 7 inhabitants—a high ratio for Brazil.

The economic sectors of the town are divided into 285 commercial establishments, 29 industries, 25 services, and 02 banks.  The town had 2,469 houses.  Twelve churches attended to the religious needs of the population.

Itapagipe is an important agricultural producer.  There were 183,000 head of cattle in 2006, of which 35,000 head were dairy cows.  In permanent crops there were 392 ha. planted, while in perennial crops 14,000 ha. were planted (2006).
The crops with a planted area of more than 100 hectares were pineapple, rice, oranges, sugarcane, corn, sorghum, and soybeans.

Health and education

In the health sector there were 05 health clinics and one hospital with 15 beds.  In the educational sector there were 05 primary schools and 01 middle school.

Municipal Human Development Index: 0.788 (2000)
State ranking: 61 out of 853 municipalities 
National ranking: 705 out of 5,138 municipalities 
Literacy rate: 89%
Life expectancy: 74 (average of males and females)

The highest ranking municipality in Minas Gerais in 2000 was Poços de Caldas with 0.841, while the lowest was Setubinha with 0.568.  Nationally the highest was São Caetano do Sul in São Paulo with 0.919, while the lowest was Setubinha.  In more recent statistics (considering 5,507 municipalities) Manari in the state of Pernambuco has the lowest rating in the country—0,467—putting it in last place.

See also

List of municipalities in Minas Gerais

References

Municipalities in Minas Gerais